The Books of the Named (also known as the Ratha series) is a series of young adult prehistoric fiction novels by Clare Bell. These prehistoric wild cats herd prehistoric horses and deer. Ratha, the main character of the series, discovers the Red Tongue, which is what the cats call fire. Thistle-chaser, her daughter, appears in the books, too, and explanations of the series are in the first link below:

External links 
 Ratha's Courage, author and fan website for the series

Notes 

American young adult novels
Young adult novel series
Novels set in prehistory
Children's novels about animals